John Ahern may refer to:

John Ahern (footballer) (born 1970), Australian rules footballer
John Ahern (politician) (1934–2020), American politician
John E. Ahern (1897–1969), Canadian politician
John Ahern (bishop), Irish Roman Catholic bishop